The Shire of Broome is one of the four local government areas in the Kimberley region of northern Western Australia, covering an area of , most of which is sparsely populated. Many Aboriginal communities are within the Shire, notably Beagle Bay and Bardi (One Arm Point).

The Shire of Broome includes the Rowley Shoals  to the west.

History

The Shire of Broome was first established as the second Broome Road District on 20 December 1918, when it was separated from the West Kimberley Road District. The area had been previously represented by an earlier Broome Road District (1901-1908) and the Municipality of Broome (1904-1918) but both had merged back into the West Kimberley district.

It was declared a shire with effect from 1 July 1961 following the passage of the Local Government Act 1960, which reformed all remaining road districts into shires.

Elected council
The Shire is divided into two wards.

 Broome Ward (seven councillors)
 Dampier Ward (two councillors)

Towns and localities
The towns and localities of the Shire of Broome with population and size figures based on the most recent Australian census:

(* indicates locality is only partially located within this shire)

Indigenous communities
Indigenous communities in the Shire of Broome:
 Ardyaloon (One Arm Point/Bardi)
 Beagle Bay
 Bidyadanga
 Djarindjin (Lombadina)

Heritage-listed places

As of 2023, 144 places are heritage-listed in the Shire of Broome, of which 51 are on the State Register of Heritage Places, among them the Sun Picture Gardens, Broome Cable House and Anglican Church of the Annunciation.

Notes

 A search for Broome LGA returns 356 hits, of which 216 are for the Broomehill-Tambellup LGA, 144 for Broome LGA and one for Wyndham-East Kimberley LGA
 A search for Broome LGA returns 56 hits, of which five are for the Broomehill-Tambellup LGA and 51 for Broome LGA

References

External links
 

Broome
Broome, Western Australia